Dr. Ross H. Cordy was the branch chief of archaeology in the State of Hawaii's Historic Preservation Division, having headed that office and program for 16 years. He is currently the Humanities Division chair at the University of Hawaiʻi – West Oʻahu where he teaches Hawaiian and Pacific Islands studies courses and a few archeology courses.  Cordy is a volunteer archeology instructor for the Waianae High School - Hawaiian Studies Program, where he teaches hands-on archeology, history and historic preservation issues.

He has conducted research on Hawaiian archaeological and historical topics since 1968. He has done fieldwork throughout the Hawaiian Islands, on all the major Micronesian Islands, and in the Society Islands, and taught at universities in New Zealand. His writings include more than 80 published articles, books and monographs and numerous manuscript papers on a wide variety of Pacific subjects.

Cordy was raised in Davis, California, and received his BA from University of California, Santa Barbara, MA from University of Michigan and Ph.D. from University of Hawaiʻi at Mānoa. Cordy is part of a family of researchers and academics. His sister, Dr. Ann Cordy Ph.D. is a textile specialist who has studied Oceanic textiles.  His mother, Elizabeth Cordy M.A., was also a textile specialist. His father, Dr. Donald R. Cordy, was a founding member of the UC Davis School of Veterinary Medicine. He chaired the pathology department from 1960 until 1969. His cousin, Alana Cordy-Collins, was an anthropologist and archaeologist who specialized in Peruvian prehistory, and her father was Mayanist Napoleon Cordy.

Some published works
An Ancient History of Wai'anae, by Ross H. Cordy, Mutual Publishing, 2002.
The Rise and Fall of the Oahu Kingdom, by Ross Cordy, Mutual Publishing, 2002.
Exalted Sits the Chief: The Ancient History of Hawai'i Island, by Ross Cordy, Mutual Publishing, 2000

External links
University of Hawaiʻi – West Oʻahu web site
Unearthing Hawaii’s History – Honolulu Star-Bulletin article

Year of birth missing (living people)
Living people
American archaeologists
University of Hawaiʻi at Mānoa alumni
Historians of Hawaii
University of California, Santa Barbara alumni
University of Michigan alumni